1747 Wright, provisional designation , is a stony asteroid and a sizable Mars-crosser, approximately 6 kilometers in diameter.

It was discovered on 14 July 1947, by American astronomer Carl Wirtanen at Lick Observatory on Mount Hamilton near San Jose, California. It was named in memory of astronomer William Hammond Wright.

Orbit and classification 

Wright orbits the Sun at a distance of 1.5–1.9 AU once every 2 years and 3 months (816 days). Its orbit has an eccentricity of 0.11 and an inclination of 21° with respect to the ecliptic. As no precoveries were taken and no previous identifications were made, Wright's observation arc begins with its official discovery observation at Mount Hamilton in 1947.

Physical characteristics

Spectral type and mineralogy 

In the SMASS taxonomic system, Wright is an Sl-type, which transitions between the common stony S-type and the less common L-type asteroids. In the Tholen classification, this asteroid could not be assigned to a specific type. Its spectrum was unusual and noisy and resembled that of an A-type asteroid.

In 2012, Wright was observed in the near-infrared using the SpeX instrument of the NASA Infrared Telescope Facility on Mauna Kea, Hawaii. The spectral measurement indicate that Wright is not an olivine-rich A-type, but rather similar to the ordinary chondrites, with the common H chondrite as the most likely meteorite analogue for the asteroid's composition, as the spectra strongly indicate the presence of rock-forming pyroxenes minerals. The team of astronomers also characterized Wright as an  class asteroid using the Bus–DeMeo taxonomic system.

Diameter and albedo 

According to the surveys carried out by the Infrared Astronomical Satellite IRAS and the Japanese Akari satellite, the asteroid measures 5.17 and 6.35 kilometers in diameter and its surface has an albedo of 0.20 and 0.32, respectively. The Collaborative Asteroid Lightcurve Link agrees with the results obtained by IRAS.

Photometry 

In July 2005, a rotational lightcurve of Wright was obtained by astronomers Reiner Stoss, Jaime Nomen, Salvador Sánchez and Raoul Behrend at the Mallorca Observatory, Spain. Lightcurve analysis gave a well-defined rotation period of  hours with a brightness variation of 0.61 magnitude.

In July 2014, another, concurring lightcurve with a period of  hours and an amplitude of 0.53 was obtained by Robert Stephens at the Trojan Station of the Center for Solar System Studies in Landers, southern California.

Naming 

This minor planet was named in memory of American astronomer William Hammond Wright (1871–1959), staff member and later director of the discovering Lick Observatory until 1942. A pioneer in astrophysics, his large, wide-field 20-inch Carnegie double astrograph built for the observatory's proper motion survey (first light in 1941), was using distant galaxies ("spiral nebulae") as object references. During this survey, many comets and asteroids were discovered as a by-product. The official  was published by the Minor Planet Center on 20 February 1976. Wright is also honored by the Martian and lunar craters Wright.

References

External links 
 Surface Mineralogy of Mars-Crossing Asteroid 1747 Wright: Analogous to the H Chondrites, fact sheet (PDF)
 Asteroid spectrum classification using Bus-DeMeo taxonomy, Planetary Spectroscopy at MIT
 Asteroid Lightcurve Database (LCDB), query form (info )
 Dictionary of Minor Planet Names, Google books
 Asteroids and comets rotation curves, CdR – Observatoire de Genève, Raoul Behrend
 Discovery Circumstances: Numbered Minor Planets (1)-(5000) – Minor Planet Center
 
 

001747
Discoveries by Carl A. Wirtanen
Named minor planets
001747
001747
19470714